Brayden Lenius (born December 19, 1996) is a Canadian football wide receiver for the Saskatchewan Roughriders of the Canadian Football League (CFL). He played college football at New Mexico and Washington. He has also been a member of the Atlanta Falcons of the National Football League (NFL).

High school career
Lenius played for the Carson Graham Eagles in North Vancouver. He then moved to the Los Angeles area to play for the Chaminade College Eagles for his grade 12 year.

College career 
Lenius played college football for the Washington Huskies from 2014 to 2017. He did not play in 2016 and used a redshirt season. He graduated from the University of Washington and transferred to the University of New Mexico to play for the Lobos in 2018.

Professional career

Saskatchewan Roughriders 
Heading into the 2019 CFL Draft, Lenius was ranked by the CFL Central Scouting Bureau as the 11th best player available in the draft.

He was drafted in the second round, 15th overall, by the Saskatchewan Roughriders and signed with the team on May 15, 2019. He played in his first professional game on July 6, 2019, against the Calgary Stampeders. Three weeks later, he recorded his first catch in a game against the BC Lions on July 27, 2021. Overall, he played in 11 regular season games for the Roughriders in 2019 where he had two receptions for four yards. He did not play in 2020 due to the cancellation of the 2020 CFL season.

In his sophomore season, Lenius made the team's opening day roster and scored his first career professional touchdown on a 12-yard pass from Cody Fajardo against the BC Lions on August 6, 2021. He had celebrated by throwing the ball into the stands, but the family that had caught the ball offered to return the keepsake to him. He finished the season having played in all 14 regular season games and recorded 37 receptions for 471 yards and four touchdowns. He also played in both post-season games where he had six catches for 43 yards. On January 7, 2022, Lenius was released one month prior to his contract expiring in order to pursue National Football League opportunities.

Atlanta Falcons 
On January 10, 2022, Lenius signed a contract with the Atlanta Falcons of the National Football League. On July 28, 2022, he was waived.

Saskatchewan Roughriders 
On August 29, 2022, Lenius re-signed with the Saskatchewan Roughriders.

Personal life 
Lenius was born in Regina, Saskatchewan, to parents Shauna Lenius and Troy Dickey. He moved with his mother, Shauna, to Vancouver, British Columbia, following the divorce of his parents. Shauna played basketball for the Regina Cougars. Lenius' father, Troy, played at wide receiver for the Roughriders in 1995. Lenius had legally changed his last name to "Dickey" in December 2017. His father died on January 6, 2018, following a stroke he had suffered on December 28, 2017, in Glendale, Arizona, where he was staying to watch Lenius play in the 2017 Fiesta Bowl. Lenius' paternal grandfather, Eldridge Dickey, played at wide receiver for the Oakland Raiders for four years, but played quarterback for the Tennessee State Tigers. Lenius' maternal grandparents were season-ticket holders for the Roughriders for many years, but his grandfather, Jim Lenius, died five days before Brayden was selected in the 2019 CFL Draft.

References

External links 
Atlanta Falcons bio

1996 births
Living people
American football wide receivers
Atlanta Falcons players
Canadian football wide receivers
New Mexico Lobos football players
Players of Canadian football from Saskatchewan
Saskatchewan Roughriders players
Sportspeople from Regina, Saskatchewan
Washington Huskies football players